The Minister of State at the Department of Transport is a junior ministerial post in the Department of Transport of the Government of Ireland who may perform functions delegated by the Minister for Transport. A Minister of State does not hold cabinet rank.

The Department of Transport and Power was created in 1959; in 1984, as the Department of Transport, it was abolished and its functions were transferred to the Department of Communications. The Department of the Public Service was created in 1973; in 1987, its original functions were transferred to the Department of Finance, and it is the legal predecessor of the current Department of Transport. For this reason, the lists below show overlapping departments.

The current Minister of State is Jack Chambers, TD who was appointed in 2022. Chambers is also Minister of State at the Department of the Environment, Climate and Communications.

List of Parliamentary Secretaries

List of Ministers of State

References

Transport
Department of Transport (Ireland)